Cosmos is a 2010 Turkish-Bulgarian drama film, written and directed by Reha Erdem, starring  as a thief and a miracle worker who is welcomed into a tiny, snowbound border village after resuscitating a half-drowned boy. The film also won the Golden Apricot  at the 2010 Yerevan International Film Festival, Armenia, for Best Feature Film.

Production
The film was shot on location in Kars, Turkey.

References

External links 
 
 

2010 drama films
2010 films
Films set in Turkey
Films shot in Turkey
Golden Orange Award for Best Film winners
2010s Turkish-language films
Bulgarian drama films
Turkish drama films